Ponni (பொன்னி) is an upcoming Indian Tamil-language television series, starring Vaishu Sundar and Sabari Nathan in the title role, along with Shamitha Shreekumar, Varun Udhai, Karthik Sasidharan, Sridevi Ashok and Yuvanraj Nethrun. 

The series is about revolves around the a father and daughter relationship. It is scheduled for release on Star Vijay in the first half of 2023.

Synopsis
The story revolves around Ponni and her father, is a story of a girl who plans to get married for the sake of her father. But her father is unwell,  so she prepares all the wedding arrangements by herself. How Ponni's marriage takes away all the obstacles and has a happy life forms the crux of the serial.

Cast

Main
 Vaishu Sundar as Ponni
 Sabari Nathan as Sakthi

Recurring 
 Shamitha Shreekumar
 Eshwar Ragunathan
 Varun Udhai
 Karthik Sasidharan
 Sridevi Ashok
 Yuvanraj Nethrun
 Bhargavi Eshwaramoorthy
 Tharshika

Production

Casting
Vaishu Sundar was cast as Ponni by making her first lead role. Sabari Nathan plays the male lead alongside her. Shamitha Shreekumar was cast as Negative role.

Release
The first promo was unveiled on 17 February 2023, featuring protagonist Vaishu Sundar as a bride, The second promo was unveiled on 25 February 2023, featuring protagonist Shamitha Shreekumar, Sabari Nathan and Eshwar Ragunathan. Another promo released on March 18, 2023, revealing the release date and time. It will begin airing on Star Vijay starting March 27th, 2023 at 2:30 PM

References

Star Vijay original programming
Tamil-language melodrama television series
2023 Tamil-language television series debuts
Tamil-language television shows
Television shows set in Tamil Nadu